The 2019 Ovo Energy Women's Tour was the sixth staging of The Women's Tour, a women's cycling stage race held in the United Kingdom. It ran from 10 to 15 June 2019, as part of the 2019 UCI Women's World Tour.

Teams
Sixteen teams, each with a maximum of six riders, started the race:

UCI Women's WorldTeams

Route

Classification leadership table

Final standings

See also
 2019 in women's road cycling

Notes

References

External links

2019 UCI Women's World Tour
2019 in women's road cycling
2019 in British women's sport
2019
June 2019 sports events in the United Kingdom